Josephville is a rural locality in the Scenic Rim Region, Queensland, Australia.

The main land use in the area is agriculture.

Geography

Part of the northern border is marked by the Logan River and its tributary Sandy Creek.  A section of the border in the south also follows the Logan River.  In the west the land rises to elevations above 500 m above sea level.  Both the Mount Lindesay Highway and the Sydney–Brisbane rail corridor pass through Josephville.

History
The Beaudesert Shire Tramway, which operated from 1903 to 1944, had a station here.

Josephville was once part of Beaudesert Shire, a former local government area.

Tenders were called to build Tamrookum Lower State School in May 1909, with A.C. Lather's tender of £181 5s accepted in June 1909. The school opened on 4 November 1909. On 15 October 1928 it was renamed Josephville State School. It closed on 1 September 1935 due to poor attendances.

The locality contains 65 households, in which 47.0% of the population are males and 53.0% of the population are females with a median age of 43, 5 years above the national average. The average weekly household income is $1,312, $126 below the national average. 1.8% of Josephville's population is either of Aborigional or Torres Strait Islander descent. 55.9% of the population aged 15 or over is either registered or de facto married, while 44.1% of the population is not married. 26.7% of the population is currently attending some form of a compulsory education. The most common nominated ancestries were Australian (34.7%), English (30.7%) and Irish (15.1%), while the most common country of birth was Australia (90.6%), and the most commonly spoken language at home was English (94.4%). The most common nominated religions were Catholic (25.8%), Anglican (23.9%) and the Uniting Church (17.2%). The most common occupation was a manager (23.1%) and the majority/plurality of residents worked 40 or more hours per week (59.1%).

Economy 
There are a number of homesteads in the locality:

 Mountain Dale
 Riverleigh
 Tally-Ho
 The Hollow

Education 
There are no schools in Josephville. The nearest government primary schools are Tamrookum State School in Tamrookum to the south and Beaudesert State School in neighbouring Beaudesert to the north west. The nearest government secondary school is Beaudesert State High School in Beaudesert.

See also
 List of tramways in Queensland

References

External links

Scenic Rim Region
Localities in Queensland